Daniel Leino (born 29 August 1991) is a Swedish footballer who plays for Strömsbergs IF as a midfielder.

References

External links
 (archive)

1991 births
Living people
Association football midfielders
Gefle IF players
Allsvenskan players
Swedish footballers